Analogy was a German and Italian psychedelic rock, progressive rock band, active in the 1970s. The band was launched by the guitarist Martin Thurn when attending the European School, Varese. In 1968, Thurn founded a band called Sons of Glove. Other members were Wolfgang Schoene, Thomas Schmidt (later Pell Mell) and Jutta Nienhaus. The band later renamed itself to Joice (due to a misprint later as The Yoice) in 1970 with drummer Hermann-Jürgen Nienhaus (brother of Jutta) and Mauro Rattaggi (bass), the only Italian member of the band. During a music festival in Arona, a spontaneous collaboration happened with keyboarder Nikola Pankoff whilst playing a free interpretation of Pink Floyd's "Atom Heart Mother". Pankoff became a band member thereafter. Finally, in 1972, after becoming a more centered progressive rock band, they decided to change their name to Analogy. Their first release was the single "Sold Out" / "God's Own Land", two songs written by Thurn. At the end of the year, Rattaggi had to join the army and left the band. Schoene changed to the bass guitar.

Members
Martin Thurn (1950 – 2018) – Guitar
Nicola Pankoff (1948) – Keyboards
Wolfgang Schoene (1950) – Bass
Hermann-Jurgen Nienhaus (1952 – 1990) – Drums
Jutta Nienhaus (1953 – 2018) – Vocals
Rocco Abate (1950) – Flute
Mauro Rattaggi (1952) – Bass

Discography
 Analogy (1972, Produzioni Ventotto)
 The Suite (1993)
 25 Years Later (1995)

References

External links
  Myspace profile
 
  Analogy profile at musicbrainz.org
 [ Analogy profile at Allmusic.com]

Italian progressive rock groups
German progressive rock groups
Musical groups established in 1972